John J. Hickey (1911–1970) was a U.S. Senator from Wyoming from 1961 to 1962. Senator Hickey may also refer to:

Jimmy Hickey Jr. (born 1966), Arkansas State Senate
Theodore M. Hickey (1910–1993), Louisiana State Senate
Thomas J. Hickey (1930–2016), Nevada State Senate
Vivian Hickey (1916–2016), Illinois State Senate
William F. Hickey Jr. (1929–2016), Connecticut State Senate
William J. Hickey (fl. 1920s–1940s), New York State Senate